Clarence Emanuel Lehr (May 16, 1886 – January 31, 1948) nicknamed "King", was a Major League Baseball outfielder and infielder who played for the Philadelphia Phillies in . He was a board chairman of the Detroit Racing Association. He died after suffering a ruptured artery while working at his office in the Lafayette Building in Detroit.

Notes

External links

Philadelphia Phillies players
1886 births
Baseball players from Michigan
1948 deaths
People from Escanaba, Michigan
Buffalo Bisons (minor league) players
Jersey City Skeeters players